The Silver State South Solar Project is a 250 megawatt (MWAC) photovoltaic power plant located in Clark County, Nevada, and near the previously completed 50 MWAC Silver State North Solar Project and the 530 MW gas-fired Higgins Generating Station.   The project was completed in late 2016 and was constructed by subcontractors for First Solar.  The plant is owned and operated by a subsidiary of NextEra Energy Resources, and power is being sold to Southern California Edison.

The project occupies approximately 2,900 acres of public lands and is located adjacent to Primm, Nevada, in the Jean Lake/Roach Lake Special Recreation Management Area (SRMA).

Electricity Production

See also 

 Solar power in Nevada
 List of power stations in Nevada

References

External links 
 Silver State Solar South Project

Solar power in the Mojave Desert
Photovoltaic power stations in the United States
Solar power stations in Nevada
Buildings and structures in Clark County, Nevada
Southern California Edison
NextEra Energy